Bryman, is a populated place in the central Mojave Desert, within San Bernardino County, California.
It is on the historic U.S. Route 66, 5 miles north of Oro Grande, and south of Helendale.

History
Bryman lies along the Mojave River, and was along the route of the Mohave Trail from the Colorado River to the valleys of Southern California before the time of the Spanish explorations. From 1828 it was along then Old Spanish Trail and from 1849 the later Mormon Road.

Lane's Station
Bryman was initially a location of the second ranch called Lane's or Lane's Station belonging to Aaron G. Lane, one of the first settlers on the Mojave River. He relocated to the area 7 miles down river from his first ranch he had settled in 1859, (also called "Lane's"), at Lane's Crossing, for the better soil and water available from the river there. His ranch raised sheep and cattle and was well known for its crops of corn, melons and vegetables. He was one of the first to grow lucerne (alfalfa) in California, and sold his crops to the U. S. Army post at Camp Cady, from 1867.

He sold this ranch in November 1873.

References

Old Spanish Trail (trade route)
Mormon Road
Unincorporated communities in San Bernardino County, California
Populated places in the Mojave Desert
Mojave River
Victor Valley
Unincorporated communities in California